Chaperiidae is a family of bryozoans belonging to the order Cheilostomatida.

Genera:
 Aluis López-Gappa & Pérez, 2019
 Amphiblestrella Prud'homme, 1961
 Bryochaperia Zágoršek, 2001
 Catenariopsis Maplestone, 1889
 Chaperia Jullien, 1881
 Chaperiopsis Uttley, 1949
 Clipeochaperia Uttley & Bullivant, 1972
 Exallozoon Gordon, 1982
 Exostesia Brown, 1948
 Icelozoon Gordon, 1982
 Larnacicus Norman, 1903
 Notocoryne Hayward & Cook, 1979
 Patsyella Brown, 1948
 Pyrichaperia Gordon, 1982

References

Cheilostomatida
Bryozoan families